Mikropolis (Greek: Μικρόπολις) is a village in the Drama regional unit. It belongs to the Prosotsani municipality and according to the 2011 census it has a population of 845 residents.

History 
A Latin inscription which was found in the village and was published in 1876 by L. Heuzey  and H. Daumet, states that in this area there must have existed a Roman vicus which belonged to the colony of Philippi. 

Mikropolis in 1885 had in total 2000 residents, of which 50 were Greeks, 750 Muslims and 1200 Slavic speakers, some affiliated with the Patriarchate and some with the Exarchate. In 1910 the village is also named Karlikova with 1900 residents, 900 Greeks and 1000 Muslims.

References 

Commons category link is on Wikidata
Populated places in Drama (regional unit)